The Huaguruncho mountain range (also spelled Huagaruncho or Huagoruncho) is situated in the Andes of Peru. The range is located in the Huánuco Region, in the provinces of Ambo and Pachitea, and in the Pasco Region, in the provinces of Pasco and Oxapampa.

Mountains 
Other mountains are listed below:

 Añilcocha, 
 Jochojanca
 Mishiguaganan
 Naticocha, 
 Ñausanca, 
 Ñausacocha, 
 Qarwarahu
 Quiulacocha, 
 Tamboragra, 
 Ulcumayo
 Hualgashjanca
 Huaraco
 Yanacocha, 
 Altos Machay,

Glaciers 
In 2009, it was reported that this mountain range had 41 glaciers that summed up  of glaciated area.

Lakes 
There are about 70 lakes in this mountain range.

References

Mountain ranges of Peru
Mountain ranges of Pasco Region
Mountain ranges of Huánuco Region